Moisès Bertran i Ventejo, in Spanish Moisés Bertrán (born Mataró, 1967) is a Catalan composer. He studied his Masters at the Hartt School of Music.

Selected works

 Bertran's scores are largely published by Clivis Publicacions, Editorial de Música Boileau, Tritó Distribucions and La Mà de Guido
Stage
 El último día de Francisco Pizarro, Opera (2006–2009)

Orchestral
 Introspecció for string orchestra (1990)
 Rondó (1992)
 Catalanesca (1994)
 Hartford, Fantasia for string orchestra (1999)
 Petita Simfonia for string orchestra (1998)
 Tres Momentos en Antioquia (2002)
 Variaciones Sinfónicas sobre un tema de Henry Eccles (Symphonic Variations on a Theme of Henry Eccles) (2005)

Concertante
 Concerto for piano and orchestra (2000)
 Esguards Silents for guitar and string orchestra (2003)
 Concertino for piano and string orchestra (2006)
 A Double Bass Fantasy, Fantasia for double bass and wind orchestra (2010)
 Concerto for violin and orchestra (2012–2013)

Chamber music
 Absència for violin and piano (1990)
 Piano Trio (1995)
 Sonatine pour Mykeko for flute and piano (1997)
 Quartet Ciutat Vella for flute, violin, viola and cello (1998)
 Trio for oboe, bassoon and piano (1998)
 Homenatge a J.S. Bach for violin and piano (2000)
 Suite for Wind Quintet (2000)
 Variacions i Fantasia sobre un tema de Salvador Pueyo for guitar and piano (2000)
 Suite para Elisza for clarinet and piano (2002)
 Sketch for 2 percussionists (2002)
 Miniatures per Gaudí for flute and guitar (2002)
 Adiós en Lima (Farwell in Lima), Prelude for double bass and piano (2004, 2010); original version for piano solo
 Perpetuum for double bass (2004)
 Preludio para Lima for guitar (2004)
 Sonatina líquida for flute, viola and harp (2006)
 Rapsodia for saxophone and piano (2011)
 Camins de vidre for violin and harp (or guitar, or piano) (2012)
 Secretos Compartidos, Suite in 5 movements for violin  and viola (2012)

Piano
 Tema amb variacions (1988)
 Cinc petites peces (5 Small Pieces) (2000)
 A la memòria de Frederic Mompou (To the Memory of Federico Mompou) for piano 4-hands (2002)
 Blusing for Marcel (2004)
 Adiós en Lima (Farwell in Lima), Prelude (2004); also for double bass and piano
 Homenajes, Suite in 8 Movements and Epilogue for 22 pianos (2006)
 Sis Preludis (6 Preludes) (2011)
 Comiat a Elliot (Elliot's Farewell), Preludes (2012)

References

External links
 Moisès Bertran at Associació Catalana de Compositors

1967 births
Living people